Corydoras polystictus is a tropical freshwater fish belonging to the Corydoradinae sub-family of the family Callichthyidae.  It originates in inland waters in South America, and is found in the Paraguay River basin in Brazil.

The fish will grow in length up to 1.3 inches (3.2 centimeters).  It lives in a tropical climate in water with a 6.0 – 8.0 pH, a water hardness of 2 – 25 dGH, and a temperature range of 72 – 83 °F (22 – 28 °C).  It feeds on worms, benthic crustaceans, insects, and plant matter.  It lays eggs in dense vegetation and adults do not guard the eggs.

Astyanax bimaculatus have been found to follow C. polystictus to eat insects, crustaceans, plant debris and algae that is flushed out by the catfish's foraging.

See also
 List of freshwater aquarium fish species

References

External links
 Photos at Fishbase

Corydoras
Fish described in 1912